Craig Richards (born 1966, Bournemouth, England) is a tech house DJ, also known as part of Tyrant alongside Lee Burridge and, initially, Sasha.

Richards studied illustration at Saint Martins School of Art in London and is also a photographer and painter.
He collaborated with producer Howie B on a music, poetry, and visual art project called A Short Run.

Discography
 Tyrant with Lee Burridge (Distinct'ive Breaks Records) 2000
 Fabric 01 (Radio Mix) (Promo) (Fabric) 2001
 Fabric 01 (Fabric) 2001
 Tyrant No Shoes, No Cake with Lee Burridge (2xCD) (Fabric) 2002
 Fabric 15: Tyrant (2xCD) (Fabric) 2004
 Fabric Dance De Lux CD: Craig Richards (Sinedín Music) 2005		
 The Two Headed Monster with Transparent Sound (2xCD) (Orson Records) 2006
 Fabric 58: Craig Richards presents The Nothing Special (Fabric) 2011

References

External links
Interview with Keith Reilly and Craig Richards of Fabric
Interview with The Independent

1966 births
Living people
Club DJs
Musicians from Bournemouth
Electronic dance music DJs